Zakiya, Zakia, Zakiyah, Zakiyya or Zakieh may represent two different female given names of Arabic origin, namely  (zakiat), meaning "pure", corresponding to the male name Zaki, and   (ḏakiyya), meaning "intelligent".

Zakiah, also spelt Zakiya, Zakia, Zakiyah, or Zakayah, is a Hebrew female given name also meaning "pure". It may be used as a Hebrew equivalent of Katherine, owing to Katherine's supposed Greek derivation from katharos "pure".

List of people with the given name Zakiya or Zakia
 Zakiya Bywaters, professional soccer player
Zakiah Hanum, 1989 Malaysian Magsaysay awardees recipient 
Zakia Khattabi (born 1976), Belgian politician
Zakia Kohzad (born ca. 1950), Tajik-American television journalist
Zakiya (singer), American singer
Zakia Mrisho Mohamed (born 1984), Tanzanian long-distance runner
Zakiya Nassar (born 1987), Palestinian swimmer
Zakiya Randall (born 1991), American golfer
Zakia Wardak, Afghan architect, politician, and businesswoman

References

Arabic feminine given names